Maria Sharapova was the defending champion, but could not defend the title because of her provisional suspension after failing a drug test at the Australian Open.

Serena Williams won the title in Rome for the fourth time, defeating Madison Keys in the final, 7–6(7–5), 6–3. This was Williams's second title in Rome that she won without dropping a set.

Seeds
The top eight seeds received a bye into the second round.

Draw

Finals

Top half

Section 1

Section 2

Bottom half

Section 3

Section 4

Qualifying

Seeds

Qualifiers

Draw

First qualifier

Second qualifier

Third qualifier

Fourth qualifier

Fifth qualifier

Sixth qualifier

Seventh qualifier

Eighth qualifier

References

External links
Main draw
Qualifying draw

2016 WTA Tour
Women's Singles